Froylan D. Salinas (October 5, 1939 – May 10, 2021) was an American politician who served in the Texas House of Representatives from 1977 to 1985. Salinas lived in Lubbock, Texas.

He died on May 10, 2021, in Austin, Texas, at age 81.

References

1939 births
2021 deaths
Democratic Party members of the Texas House of Representatives
Hispanic and Latino American state legislators in Texas
People from Lubbock, Texas